Colegio San Agustin is a private Catholic primary and secondary school, located in Lima, Peru. The school was founded in 1903 as part of the evangelizing mission of the Order of Saint Augustine by the Province of Our Lady of Grace of Peru.

History

The school began operating on March 15, 1903, under the direction of Fr Ignacio Monasterio. Its first location was the Convent of Nuestra Señora de Gracia, commonly known as "St. Augustine" on Ica Street in downtown Lima. The initial teaching staff consisted of 8 clergymen and the student population was fifty-two (52).

The school ran a boarding school until 1920 with a capacity for about eighty (80) students.

The school remained in its original location for 52 years until 1955; that year, authorized by R. M. (Education Ministry Decree) No. 1369 of February 16, 1955, the school was moved to its current campus located at the intersection of Avenida Javier Prado and Paseo de la Republica, in the San Isidro district. On December 21, 1958, the solemn blessing and opening of the college chapel took place. At the same time the section dedicated to the early grades was opened, this area is currently occupied by the 3rd and 4th grades of primary school. In 1959 the School Library was inaugurated. In 1969 the Great Coliseum, which seats some 3000 spectators, was opened. Pre-kinder was reinstated in 1985, under the name 'Initial Education'. In 1978, during the celebration of its Diamond Jubilee, the school was inducted in the Ministry of Education's Honor Registry. In 1992, the school went co-educational; it had been an all-male school until then. Co-ed education started with the earliest grade in 1993; the first co-ed class graduated in 2004.

The school expansion has continued within the confines of the San Isidro campus, a brand new auditorium for 1148 spectators was opened on June 30, 2001, adding a new all-purpose venue to the city of Lima.

Principals

 M.R.P. Ignacio Monasterio E.
 M.R.P. Casto Roza R.
 M.R.P. Francisco Muñiz A.
 M.R.P. José Maria Alvarez B.
 M.R.P. Benito González G.
 M.R.P. Graciano Montes F.
 M.R.P. Isaac Pajares I.
 M.R.P. José Robla B.
 M.R.P. Senén Fernández B.
 José Garcia P.
 M.R.P. Ricardo de Canceco S.
 José Garcia P.
 Priest Jesús Delgado A.
 M.R.P. Restituto Diez R.
 M.R.P. Benito Mancebo M.
 M.R.P. Honorato García G.
 M.R.P. Arsenio Anibarro A.
 M.R.P. Cesáreo Miguélez del R.
 M.R.P. Juan Manuel Cuenca C.
 M.R.P. Cesáreo Fernández de las Cuevas
 M.R.P. José Souto Prado
 M.R.P José Maria Verdejo Verdejo
 M.R.P. Senén González M.
 M.R.P. Elias Neira A.

Notable alumni

 Jaime Bayly is a Peruvian writer, journalist and TV celebrity
 Sebastián Salazar Bondy, play writer, essayist, poet, journalist and a notable Peruvian intellectual
 Fernando Carbone, M.D. former Minister of Health
 Jaime Cuadra, actor
 Javier Pérez de Cuéllar, Secretary-General of the United Nations from January 1, 1982 to December 31, 1991

See also 

 Education in Peru
 Catholic Church in Peru

References 

Catholic primary schools in Peru
Catholic secondary schools in Peru
Augustinian schools
1900s establishments in Peru
Educational institutions established in 1903
Schools in Lima